Eckler is a surname. Notable people with the surname include:

A. Ross Eckler (1901–1991), deputy director of the U.S. Census Bureau from 1949 to 1965, and director from 1965 to 1969
A. Ross Eckler Jr. (born 1927), American scientist and mathematician
Harry Eckler, from the 1940s to 1950s considered the finest hardball and fastpitch softball first baseman in Canada
Rebecca Eckler (born 1973), Canadian journalist and author

See also
Bricker & Eckler, law firm in the midwestern United States with approximately 160 attorneys and 3 offices in Ohio
Ekeler, surname
Ecker (surname)